Peter Ross McMillan (born 2 June 1987) is a professional rugby union player. His position is hooker.  McMillan has previously played professionally for Nottingham, Gloucester, Moseley, Coventry, Birmingham & Solihull, Northampton, Bristol and Leicester Tigers.

Career

Born in Chesterfield, England McMillan represented England at U19 level whilst with his first professional club Nottingham.

On 2 June 2006 Gloucester announced McMillan's signing on a 2 years contract ahead of competition from other Premiership clubs to sign him from Nottingham.  For the 2007-08 season, Ross was dual-registered with Moseley.  In a friendly prior to the 2008-09 season, McMillan suffered a ruptured cruciate ligament against Aviron Bayonnais, a season-ending injury.

McMillan signed for Coventry in the summer of 2009.

McMillan joined Northampton Saints midway through the 2011-2012 season from Birmingham & Solihull as a triallist. He was awarded a short-term contract in February 2012, followed by a full contract after his appearance as a substitute in the LV= Cup final. 
In 2014 McMillan was a replacement as Saints won the European Rugby Challenge Cup.

In January 2015, Ross was signed by Bristol on an 18-month contract.

On 10 August 2018 Leicester Tigers announced the signing of McMillan.  On 15 May 2019 he was announced as one of the players to leave Leicester following the end of the 2018-19 Premiership Rugby season.

McMillan is the Assistant Forwards Coach at London Irish.

References

External links
Gloucester Rugby profile
Moseley Profile
England profile
Northampton Saints profile

1987 births
Living people
Birmingham & Solihull R.F.C. players
Coventry R.F.C. players
English rugby union players
Gloucester Rugby players
Leicester Tigers players
Moseley Rugby Football Club players
Rugby union hookers
Rugby union players from Chesterfield